The  is the prefectural parliament of Okinawa.

Its 48 members are elected every four years in 14 districts by single non-transferable vote (SNTV). 13 electoral districts are multi-member district, one district is a single-member district where SNTV becomes equivalent to First-past-the-post voting.

The assembly is responsible for enacting and amending prefectural ordinances, approving the budget and voting on important administrative appointments made by the governor including the vice-governors.

Unlike most mainland prefectural assemblies (Hokkaidō is another exception) the Okinawa Prefectural Assembly was not in existence continuously since 1878. After the Battle of Okinawa, the United States military governed the prefecture. After Okinawa's return to the mainland in 1972, the Prefectural Assembly was restored. Since then, it had been one of three prefectures in the country that do not elect their assemblies in unified local elections (last round: 2011), the other two being Ibaraki and Tokyo (In 2011, another three prefectures hit by the Great East Japan earthquake postponed their elections).

Current composition 
As of 2017, the assembly was composed as follows:

Electoral districts 
Most electoral districts in Okinawa correspond to current cities or former counties (the counties, abolished as administrative unit in 1921, had initially by definition served as electoral districts for prefectural assemblies in the Empire).

List of Presidents & Vice Presidents

Presidents

Vice Presidents

References

External links
 Okinawa Prefectural Assembly , Resolutions related to the U.S. military presence in English
 Okinawa Prefectural Electoral Commission 

Prefectural assemblies of Japan
Politics of Okinawa